The Flint House is a historic First Period house at 28 Lexington Road in Lincoln, Massachusetts.  The oldest portions of this house have very early colonial construction, and its main block either is, or contains portions of, a "mansion" built by Ephraim Flint and mentioned in a 1709 deed.  This main block appears to have portions of two older structures that were joined; the exact sequence of construction is difficult due to extensive alterations of the building over the 18th and 19th centuries.  The property includes a barn which is thought to have been built before 1750, and is remarkably unaltered despite having been moved a relatively short distance on the grounds.  The house has been occupied by nine generations of Flints, who have been a major force in the civic life of Lincoln.

The house was listed on the National Register of Historic Places in 2003.

See also
National Register of Historic Places listings in Middlesex County, Massachusetts

References

Houses on the National Register of Historic Places in Middlesex County, Massachusetts
Houses in Lincoln, Massachusetts